Badrulzaman Abdul Halim (born on 2 April 1978 Selangor) is a Malaysian footballer who is currently a goalkeeper. He was a member of the Malaysian national team.

He was twice called up for Malaysia squad friendly against Indonesia and India in June and July 2008. He was also included in the 2008 Merdeka Tournament but was not chosen to play.

At the 2008 Myanmar Grand Royal Challenge Cup, Badrulzaman made his international debut against Vietnam on 12 November 2008 although it is not FIFA International 'A' matches. On 18 November 2008, Badrulzaman made his debut in 'A' international matches against Myanmar.

External links
 PKNS FC 2007/08 Squad List

Malaysian footballers
Malaysia international footballers
1978 births
Living people
Perlis FA players
PKNS F.C. players
Sabah F.C. (Malaysia) players
Negeri Sembilan FA players
People from Selangor
Malaysian people of Malay descent
Melaka United F.C. players
Association football goalkeepers